Poovarany is a village in Meenachil Pachayath, Palai, Kottayam district, Kerala, India.The name poovarany means jungle of flowers. The Sacred Heart Church and Sree Mahadeva temple are the main religious centers. Two small rivers, the Cheruthode and Valiyathodu, flow through the area. Most of the people belong to Syrian Malabar Nasrani and Hindu communities.

The land around Poovarany is well-suited for cultivation. Rubber, pepper, coconut, paddy, ginger, and turmeric are common items produced here.

Ponkunnam and Palai are the nearest towns. It's very near to the pilgrimage center Bharananganam. Major centers are Kumbani, Ambalam, Moolethundi, Charala, Vilakummaruth, Palli, Thazhaveli, Kochukottaram and Pachathode.

References

Villages in Kottayam district